Alexander Angel Nelcha Dubard (born 21 January 1968 in Caracas) is a former professional Venezuelan basketball player. Nelcha played professionally in France with JDA Dijon and Hyères-Toulon Var Basket, as well as in Italy with Mabo Pistoia and in Spain with CB Murcia. He played with the Venezuela national basketball team at the 1990 FIBA World Championship (12th place) and 1992 Summer Olympics (11th place).

References
FIBA Profile

1968 births
Living people
Basketball players at the 1992 Summer Olympics
CB Murcia players
JDA Dijon Basket players
Le Mans Sarthe Basket players
Liga ACB players
Limoges CSP players
Montpellier Paillade Basket players
Olimpia Basket Pistoia players
Olympic basketball players of Venezuela
Sportspeople from Caracas
Trotamundos B.B.C. players
Venezuelan expatriate basketball people in France
Venezuelan expatriate basketball people in Spain
Venezuelan expatriate basketball people in the United States
Venezuelan men's basketball players
1990 FIBA World Championship players
Power forwards (basketball)